James Henry Linacre (20 June 1880 – 11 May 1957) was an English professional footballer who played as a goalkeeper and who was one of three members of the same family who started his professional career with Derby County before joining Nottingham Forest and going on to play for England. He took part in the first foreign tour by Nottingham Forest to South America where the red shirts are said to have given inspiration to Club Atlético Independiente.

Club career

Linacre was born to farmer James Anthony and his wife Annie Linacre. They lived on Derby Road in Aston-on-Trent, Derbyshire. Linacre was the nephew of fellow footballers Fred Forman and Frank Forman and all three followed a similar career path. Linacre played for his village side and the side at nearby Draycott and for Loughborough Grammar School before being signed by Derby County. He was there for only two games however.

Linacre joined Forest in 1899. A card has been found that records a match between Nottingham Forest and Derby: it would appear from the accompanying verse that Derby won as a result of Linacre travelling backwards with the ball through his own net.

Foreign tour

Linacre was chosen to go on the first foreign tour with his Nottingham club in 1905. In the same year as he appeared for England, he toured Uruguay and Argentina. The trip had been organised at the club after a guaranteed $200 fee was offered. Thirteen players and two officials were despatched on 19 May, three weeks after the football season ended. The journey out to South America took three weeks and they had to run around the steamship Danube's decks to keep in training.

In total there were eight matches in South America and sixty goals were scored with only three being against Nottingham Forest, who did not lose a match on the tour. It is said that the Argentinian team Club Atlético Independiente changed their colours to red after seeing the Nottingham Forest players play. The tour started at Montevideo and then had a number of matches against Argentinian teams, firstly at Santa Fe and then in Buenos Aires. The party consisted of (see picture) Bob Norris, Harry Linacre, H.Hallam (Secretary), C.Clifford, Charles Craig, William Shearman, H.S. Radford (Vice President), Sam Timmins, Alf Spouncer, Fred Lessons, (Front Row L-R) – Walter Dudley, Thomas Davies, Thomas Niblo, George Henderson and Albert Holmes.

Linacre went on to make over 330 appearances for Nottingham Forest, in all competitions.

International career
Linacre was chosen to play for his country and he played twice for England in 1905. However, his England career lasted just five days. On 27 March 1905, when Linacre was aged 24 years, 279 days he was the goalie against Wales. His last cap was against Scotland on 1 April 1905. During those two matches he only conceded one goal to Wales in the first match. Both matches were England victories.

Later career
After retiring from football in 1909, Linacre went into business as a building contractor with his uncle Frank Forman. Frank, had followed a similar career to Linacre, but he continued his association with the club after he stopped playing. Linacre died in Nottingham in 1957.

References

External links

1880 births
1957 deaths
People from Aston-on-Trent
Footballers from Derbyshire
English footballers
England international footballers
Derby County F.C. players
Nottingham Forest F.C. players
English Football League players
Association football goalkeepers
People educated at Loughborough Grammar School
English Football League representative players